The 2008 Royal London Watches Grand Prix was a professional ranking snooker tournament that took place between 11 and 19 October 2008 at the S.E.C.C. in Glasgow, Scotland.

John Higgins won his first ranking event for 18 months by defeating Ryan Day 9–7 in the final.

Prize fund
The breakdown of prize money for this year is shown below: 

Winner: £75,000
Runner-up: £35,000
Semi-final: £20,000
Quarter-final: £12,000
Last 16: £9,500
Last 32: £7,100
Last 48: £4,650
Last 64: £2,200

Stage one highest break: £500
Stage two highest break: £4,000
Stage one maximum break: £1,000
Stage two maximum break: £20,000
Total: £523,100

Main draw
Matches on Sunday 12 October were played on a roll on/roll off basis. Play started at the allocated time each day with a 15-minute interval between matches. The third and fourth match did not start before 3pm. The evening session did not start before the time indicated on the format.

The draw for round one was made on completion of the qualifiers on 26 September 2008. The draw from round two up to and including the semi-finals was made on a random basis. The order of play and table numbers for all matches up to the semi-finals were determined once the draw for that round was made and published by the tournament director.

All matches up to and including the quarter-finals were best of 9 frames, semi-finals were best of 11 frames and the final was best of 17 frames. (Seedings in parentheses. All times are BST.)

Round one

 Saturday, 11 October – 12:00
  John Higgins (6) 5–0  Anthony Hamilton
  Joe Perry (13) 5–3  Barry Hawkins
 Sunday, 12 October – 13:00
  Stephen Hendry (7) 5– 4  David Gilbert
  Neil Robertson (11) 4–5  Steve Davis
 Sunday, 12 October – not before 15:00
  Marco Fu (1) 5–2  Jimmy Michie
  Mark Allen (16) 1–5  Michael Holt Sunday, 12 October – 19:00
  Graeme Dott (14) w/d-w/o  Judd Trump
  Ryan Day (9) 5–4  Ricky Walden

 Monday, 13 October – 13:30
  Stephen Maguire (3) 1–5  Jamie Cope  Ding Junhui (12) 5–0  Jamie Burnett
 Monday, 13 October – 19:00
  Mark Selby (5) 5–0  Andrew Higginson
  Peter Ebdon (10) 5–1  Simon Bedford
 Tuesday, 14 October – 13:30
  Ronnie O'Sullivan (2) 5–2  Liang Wenbo
  Ali Carter (8) 5–4  Dave Harold
 Tuesday, 14 October – 19:00
  Shaun Murphy (4) 3–5  Adrian Gunnell
  Mark King (15) 3–5  John Parrott

Round two

 Wednesday, 15 October – 14:00
  John Higgins (6) 5–2  Stephen Hendry (7)
  Ding Junhui (12) 5–2  Michael Holt
 Wednesday, 15 October – 19:00
  Adrian Gunnell  4–5  Steve Davis
  Judd Trump 5–2  Joe Perry (13)

 Thursday, 16 October – 13:30
  Marco Fu (1) 1–5  Ronnie O'Sullivan (2)
  Jamie Cope 5–4  Peter Ebdon (10)
 Thursday, 16 October – 19:00
  Mark Selby (5) 4–5  Ryan Day (9)
  John Parrott 0–5  Ali Carter (8)

Quarter-finals

 Friday, 17 October – 13:30
   Judd Trump 5–4  Ronnie O'Sullivan (2)
  Steve Davis 3–5  Ali Carter (8)

 Friday, 17 October – 19:00
  Ding Junhui (12) 3–5  John Higgins (6)
   Ryan Day (9) 5–1  Jamie Cope

Semi-finals

 Saturday, 18 October – 13:00
  John Higgins (6) 6–4  Judd Trump

 Saturday, 18 October – 19:30
  Ryan Day (9) 6–5  Ali Carter (8)

Final

Qualifying rounds
These matches took place from 22 to 25 September 2008 at the Pontin's Centre, Prestatyn, Wales.

Century breaks

Qualifying stage centuries

140  Aditya Mehta
135  Peter Lines
128  David Grace
121  Anthony Hamilton
116  Alan McManus
114, 102  James McBain
114  Jin Long
114  David Gilbert
113, 100  Adrian Gunnell
113  Supoj Saenla
113  Rory McLeod

112  Jimmy White
109  Paul Davies
109  Liang Wenbo
105, 102  Michael Holt
104, 102  Simon Bedford
104  Andrew Higginson
103  Andrew Pagett
102  Scott MacKenzie
101  Rodney Goggins
100  Tom Ford

Televised stage centuries

139, 116  Marco Fu
135, 102, 100  Mark Selby
134, 127  John Higgins
129, 120, 115, 112, 104  Ryan Day
129  Ding Junhui
126  Shaun Murphy
123  David Gilbert
122, 100  Peter Ebdon

111, 107, 107  Ali Carter
105  Michael Holt
105  Adrian Gunnell
104  Dave Harold
104  Stephen Hendry
104, 103  Ronnie O'Sullivan
103  Ricky Walden

References

2008
Grand Prix
Grand Prix
Snooker competitions in Scotland